Daia is a commune located in Giurgiu County, Muntenia, Romania. It is composed of two villages, Daia and Plopșoru.

Natives
 Vasile Pinciu
 Marin Pîrcălabu

References

Communes in Giurgiu County
Localities in Muntenia